Kullimaa is a village in Türi Parish, Rapla County in western-central Estonia.

References

 

Villages in Rapla County